Aminu Ladan Abubakar, also known as Alan Waka (born 11 February 1973), is a Hausa musician and author from Kano State Northern Nigeria.

Early life and education

Aminu Ala completed his primary education at Tudun Murtala Primary School between 1980 and 1986, then GSS Kawaji Secondary School in Dakata, Kano from 1987 to 1992 in 2004. He continued his education at the School of Technology and in Kano where he received his diploma 2007.

Publications

Ala was first known in the field of Hausa language writing before he became known in the field of music. Ala has authored nearly nine books including,

• Cin Zarafi

• Bakar Aniya

• Sawaba

• Cin Fuska

• Jirwaye

• Tarzoma

Musics

Ala started singing when he was a student at an Islamic school in when they are taught religion and education through poetry, so that they can easily understand and compose. It was at that time that they were taught songs in praise of Prophet Muhammad, whenever the month of Mawlid falls, Ala is among those who climb the pulpit in their Islam, to recite poems. That's how he instilled in Ala a passion for music.

After Ala grew up he began to try to write poetry.

References 

Nigerian musicians
Hausa-language singers
1973 births
Living people
People from Kano State
Hausa people